David Chadwick (born 1945) grew up in Texas and moved to California to study Zen as a student of Shunryu Suzuki in 1966.  Chadwick was ordained as a Buddhist priest in 1971, shortly before Suzuki's death.  He assisted in the operation of the San Francisco Zen Center for a number of years.

Chadwick has two children and has married and remarried.  He has written several books and continues to "dabble in Buddhism and related matters".  Among his works is Crooked Cucumber, the biography of Shunryu Suzuki.

Works
 Chadwick, David (1994). "Thank You and OK!: An American Zen Failure in Japan" Shambhala Publications. . Originally Penguin Arkana (2007).
 Chadwick, David (1999). Crooked Cucumber: the Life and Zen Teaching of Shunryu Suzuki. Broadway Books. . ebook, audiobook Shambhala Publications
 Chadwick, David (2007). Zen Is Right Here: Teaching Stories and Anecdotes of Shunryu Suzuki, Author of Zen Mind, Beginner's Mind Shambhala Publications (2007) . audiobook. Originally "To Shine One Corner of the World: Moments with Shunryu Suzuki." (2001) Broadway Books.
Chadwick, David (2019). To Find the Girl from Perth. Cuke Press. Originally (2008) Speir Publishing. ebook;
Chadwick, David (2019) (text); Atkeison, Andrew (illustrations) Color Dreams for To Find the Girl from Perth. Cuke Press. Originally (2009). Speir Publishing
Chadwick, David (2019) The, the Book Cuke Press.  Originally Dadwick, Chavid (2011). The. Speir Publishing.
Chadwick, David (2011). Afterword to Zen Mind, Beginner's Mind 40th Anniversary Issue. Shambhala Publications. 
Chadwick, David (2020) Afterword to Zen Mind, Beginner's Mind 50th Anniversary Issue. Shambhala Publications. 
Chadwick, David (2018) Forward, Editor. A Brief History of Tassajara: From Native American Sweat Lodges to Pioneering Zen Monastery. Cuke Press
Shunryu, Suzuki; Chadwick, David (editor) (2021). Zen Is Right Now: More Teaching Stories and Anecdotes of Shunryu Suzuki. Shambhala Publications. 
Chadwick, David & Homemade (2009). Songs for To Find the Girl from Perth. Songs to go with the book. (withdrawn 2021, being redone)
Chadwick, David (2020) Music for a Comic Book Video. MP3. Originally a record (1985).
Chadwick, David (2012) Boat of Dreams. MP3. Originally cassette tape 1986.
Chadwick, David (2019) OK Boomerang. MP3 single. 
Chadwick David (2021) Baliyuga on the Way to Venus. MP3. 
Chadwick, David (2022) Baliyuga OK Boomerang MP3.
Chadwick, David (2022) Fooled by Everything. MP3. Originally a cassette (1980).

External links
 
 Shunryu Suzuki lecture archive
 ZMBM dot net - Zen Mind, Beginner's Mind site
 Defuser Music dot com - DC's songs
 Hub for DC nonZense URLs such as the one below
 (To Find the) Girl From Perth dot com - DC's illustrated novel with songs

1945 births
Living people
American spiritual writers
Zen Buddhism writers
Writers from Texas
San Francisco Zen Center
American Zen Buddhists